Agaronia leonardhilli is a species of sea snail, a marine gastropod mollusk in the family Olividae, the olives.

Description
Original description: "Shell narrow and very elongated; spire high and elevated; one-half of spire whorls covered by enamel; anterior enamel deposit two-toned in color, with posterior half being dark brown and anterior half being gray or white; aperture narrow; columella narrow, with twisted plications; shell color gray with numerous large, dark brown, zig-zag, longitudinal flammules; on dorsum, zig-zag flammules only extend down posterior half of shell, leaving wide, clear gray band around anterior half; edge of shoulder along suture marked with conspicuous, large, intermittent, dark brown patches; spire enamel grayish-brown; interior of aperture brown."

Distribution
Locus typicus: "Off Roatan Island, Honduras."

References

Olividae
Gastropods described in 1987